Vai Passar Mal: Remixes is the first remix album by Brazilian drag queen Pabllo Vittar, containing ten remixes of songs from her debut album.

Track listing

References 

2017 remix albums
Pabllo Vittar albums